Henk Temmink (born 11 June 1952, in Elsloo, Limburg) is a Dutch chess player. As profession he is a math teacher in Landgraaf. In 1986 and 1988 he became the champion of Limburg and is master ICCF. In 1980 he became Correspondence chess champion in the Netherlands. He also plays in the championship for teams in Europe.

External links

Henk Temmink at 365Chess.com

1952 births
Living people
Dutch chess players
People from Stein, Limburg
Sportspeople from Limburg (Netherlands)
20th-century Dutch people